Hansika Motwani (born 9 August 1991) is an Indian actress who predominantly appears in Tamil and Telugu films. Hansika began her career as a child actor in Hindi films, and later went on to appear in lead roles in Telugu films, including Desamuduru (2007), Kantri (2008) and Maska (2009). She started her career in Tamil cinema with Mappillai (2011) and then appeared in several commercially successful Tamil films such as Engeyum Kadhal (2011), Velayudham (2011), Oru Kal Oru Kannadi (2012), Theeya Velai Seiyyanum Kumaru (2013),  Singam II (2013) and Aranmanai (2014). She has also acted in the Malayalam film Villain (2017).

Early life

Hansika Motwani was born to a Sindhi family in Bombay, Maharashtra (present-day Mumbai). Her father, Pradeep Motwani is a businessman and her mother, Mona Motwani is a dermatologist. She attended the Podar International School and the International Curriculum School, Santacruz, both in Mumbai.

Career

2001–2010
Hansika began her television career with a serial called Shaka Laka Boom Boom. She later acted in the Indian serial Des Mein Niklla Hoga Chand and appeared as one of the children in Koi... Mil Gaya with Preity Zinta and Hrithik Roshan.

She made her debut in a lead role at the age of 15 in a lead role in Puri Jagannadh's Telugu film Desamuduru and earned the Filmfare Award for Best Female Debut – South for her performance. She later appeared in the Hindi film Aap Kaa Surroor with Himesh Reshammiya.

Her first 2008 release was Bindaas, starring Puneeth Rajkumar, and is her first and only Kannada film to date. Later that year, she appeared in Kantri with Jr. NTR.

2011–2015

Hansika debuted in Tamil cinema with Mappillai. Her next Tamil film, Engeyum Kadhal was a successful one. The same year she went on to star alongside Vijay in Velayudham.

In 2012, she had two releases, one in Tamil and another one in Telugu. Her first release was M. Rajesh's romantic comedy film Oru Kal Oru Kannadi which became her first runaway hit and earned her positive reviews for her performance. In Telugu, she was featured in Denikaina Ready which also earned a positive response from the public. She received her first Best Actress nomination at the 60th Filmfare Awards South for her performance in the films. In 2013, she appeared in four Tamil films such as Settai, Sundar C.'s Theeya Velai Seiyyanum Kumaru, Hari's Singam II starring Suriya and Venkat Prabhu's Biriyani with Suriya's brother Karthi. She had five releases in 2014, two of them were Telugu films, the comedy flick Pandavulu Pandavulu Tummeda and the action-masala film Power. Her Tamil releases were the fantasy film Maan Karate with Sivakarthikeyan, Sundar C.'s horror comedy Aranmanai and the action thriller film Meaghamann.

Aambala, her third collaboration with Sundar C, was her first 2015 release. Her second release that year was Romeo Juliet, which marked her second film with Jayam Ravi. She also appeared in Vaalu with Silambarasan.

2016–present
In 2016, Aranmanai 2 directed by Sundar C. received mixed reviews. Hansika had a list of flops later that year, including Uyire Uyire and Pokkiri Raja. Her last release in 2016 was Manithan with Udhayanidhi Stalin.

Bogan was her first release in 2017 and it was reviewed positively. Many critics praised her for her performance in the introduction scene and the pre-climax scene. She also acted in a Telugu film Luckunnodu. She debuted in Malayalam films with Villain in 2017.

Her first release of 2018 was Gulaebaghavali in which she played a con-artist's role named Viji. Her other release of 2018 was Thuppakki Munai, starring Vikram Prabhu. In 2019, she appeared with Atharvaa in the Tamil film 100, directed by Sam Anton and in the Telugu film Tenali Ramakrishna BA. BL opposite Sundeep Kishan.

Hansika Motwani played for her 50th film in Maha (2022) as lead actress.

Personal life
Motwani converted to Buddhism. She said in an interview, "The best way to effectively de-stress for me is to chant- Nam Myo Ho Renge Kyo, as I strongly follow Buddhism." According to the actress, chanting has helped her personally and professionally.
Motwani married her longtime boyfriend, businessman Sohail Khaturiya on 4 December 2022 in Mundota Fort and Palace, Jaipur.

Other work and media image
Motwani participates in philanthropic activities. She provides monetary support for the education of underprivileged children and women who are suffering with breast cancer. She is the brand Ambassador of Chennai turns Pink, an awareness program to promote breast cancer awareness among women.

In 2014, she was featured in Forbes's 250 celebrities list.

Filmography

Films

Web series

Television

Music videos

Awards and nominations

See also
 List of Indian film actresses
 List of Tamil film actresses

References

External links

 
 

1991 births
Living people
Actresses from Mumbai
Actresses in Kannada cinema
Actresses in Tamil cinema
Actresses in Telugu cinema
Filmfare Awards South winners
Indian soap opera actresses
Indian Buddhists
Indian child actresses
Indian film actresses
21st-century Indian actresses
Sindhi people
Child actresses in Hindi cinema
Indian television actresses
Actresses in Hindi television
South Indian International Movie Awards winners
Actresses in Malayalam cinema
Santosham Film Awards winners